Loveland is a census-designated place in Pottawattamie County, Iowa, United States. As of the 2010 Census, the population of Loveland was 35.

Demographics

History
Loveland got its start in the 1860s, following construction of the Chicago and North Western Railway through the territory. It was named for E. Loveland, who owned the land where the community is located. Loveland's population was 95 in 1902, and 160 in 1925.

References

Unincorporated communities in Pottawattamie County, Iowa
Unincorporated communities in Iowa
Census-designated places in Pottawattamie County, Iowa